Kurnia Sandy (born 24 August 1975) is an Indonesian former footballer who played as a goalkeeper.

Club career 
Sandy played at Sampdoria's primavera (youth) team with Kurniawan Dwi Yulianto and Bima Sakti; unlike his teammates, Kurnia succeeded to break into the first team and became the fourth-choice goalkeeper for one season under coach Sven-Göran Eriksson. At one time when Sampdoria's first-choice goalkeeper Fabrizio Ferron was red-carded, Sampdoria attempted to promote Sandy into the first team as a backup for Matteo Sereni, but apparently, his management had yet to process Sandy's permit-related papers. Thus Sampdoria's entry was denied by the FIGC.

International career 
Sandy made a memorable performance during 1996 Asian Cup, where he denied at least six clear chance during the game against Kuwait, before rough contact against a Kuwaiti player injured him; the game eventually ended 2–2. Sandy's injury forced him to sit out the rest of the tournament. Due to second-choice goalkeeper Hendro Kartiko's fine performances, and Sandy's apparent dip in performance in the local league after his injury, Sandy lost the spot as first-choice goalkeeper for the national team.

Honours
Arema Indonesia
First Division: 2004
Copa Indonesia: 2005, 2006
Indonesia
Southeast Asian Games Silver Medal: 1997

References

External links

Indonesian footballers
Living people
People from Semarang
Sportspeople from Central Java
Indonesia international footballers
Indonesian expatriate footballers
1996 AFC Asian Cup players
1975 births
Mitra Kukar players
u.C. Sampdoria players
Arema F.C. players
Pelita Jaya FC players
PSM Makassar players
persikabo Bogor players
Persebaya Surabaya players
Persik Kediri players
bandung F.C. players
Association football goalkeepers
Competitors at the 1997 Southeast Asian Games
Southeast Asian Games competitors for Indonesia